This is a list of events in animation in 2015.

Events

January
 January 18: The first episode of Star vs. the Forces of Evil airs.
 January 19: Boomerang was rebranded as part of a global rebranding effort, offering original programming for the first time. It continues to emphasize its archival programming, but with a greatly increased emphasis on the archive's most popular brands and an explicitly family-friendly approach. The main aim of the rebranding is for Boomerang to become a "second flagship" on par with Cartoon Network.
 January 25: The Simpsons episode "The Musk Who Fell to Earth" premieres, guest starring Elon Musk as himself.
 January 31: The 42nd Annie Awards are held.

February
 February 15: The Simpsons episode "My Fare Lady" premieres, with the couch gag being animated by Paul Robertson and Ivan Dixon.
 February 27: 87th Academy Awards: 
Big Hero 6, by Don Hall, Chris Williams, and Roy Conli, wins the Academy Award for Best Animated Feature.
 Feast, by Patrick Osborne and Kristina Reed, wins the Academy Award for Best Animated Short Film.
 Hayao Miyazaki receives an Honorary Academy Award.

May
 May 17: The Simpsons episode "Mathlete's Feat" premieres, in which the couch gag is animated by the creators of Rick and Morty, Dan Harmon and Justin Roiland.

July
 July 27: The first episode of We Bare Bears debuts on Cartoon Network.

August
 August 27: Illumination's Minions becomes the first non-Disney animated film to gross over $1 billion.
 August 30: Aqua Teen Hunger Force, the longest-running Adult Swim show, airs its final episode.

September
 September 23: The South Park episode "Where My Country Gone?" premieres, in which Mr. Garrison starts a presidential campaign, directly satirizing Donald Trump. Though intended as a one-shot joke, Garrison and his presidential career are continued in later seasons of the show, when Trump is elected president in 2016.

October
 October 5: "The '90s Are All That", a late-night program block featuring Nickelodeon live-action and animated series from the 1990s that has aired on TeenNick since 2011, relaunches as "The Splat" and expands from four hours to eight (running from 10:00 pm to 6:00 am.)
 October 25: The Simpsons episode "Treehouse of Horror XXVI" premieres, in which the couch gag is animated by John Kricfalusi.

November
 November 8: The Simpsons episode "Friend with Benefit" premieres, guest starring David Copperfield.

December
 December 7: The first episode of Supernoobs airs on Cartoon Network. 
 December 16: John Henry and the Inky-Poo, The Old Mill and The Story of Menstruation are added to the National Film Registry.
 December 18: F is for Family debuts as the first Netflix original adult animated series.

Specific date unknown
 In the Flemish TV show, De Ideale Wereld on channel VIER, animated sequences titled Sociaal Incapabele Michiel are broadcast, created by Tom Borremans. These become very popular with viewers.

Awards
 Academy Award for Best Animated Feature: Inside Out
 Academy Award for Best Animated Short Film: Bear Story
 Animation Kobe Feature Film Award: TBD
 Annecy International Animated Film Festival Cristal du long métrage: TBD
 Annie Award for Best Animated Feature: Inside Out
 Annie Award for Best Animated Feature — Independent: Boy and the World
 Asia Pacific Screen Award for Best Animated Feature Film: Miss Hokusai
 BAFTA Award for Best Animated Film: Inside Out
 César Award for Best Animated Film: The Little Prince
 European Film Award for Best Animated Film: Song of the Sea
 Golden Globe Award for Best Animated Feature Film: Inside Out
 Goya Award for Best Animated Film: Capture the Flag
 Japan Academy Prize for Animation of the Year: Stand by Me Doraemon
 Japan Media Arts Festival Animation Grand Prize: TBD
 Mainichi Film Awards - Animation Grand Award: Miss Hokusai

Films released

 January 1:
 Bicycle Boy (China)
 Brave Rabbit 2 Crazy Circus (China)
 Shimajiro and the Mother Tree (Japan)
 Three Heroes. Horse Course (Russia)
 January 4 - Pirate's Passage (Canada)
 January 9 - Psycho-Pass: The Movie (Japan)
 January 15 - Magic Birds: The Movie (Greece)
 January 23 - Strange Magic (United States)
 January 27 - Justice League: Throne of Atlantis (United States)
 January 30 - Boonie Bears: Mystical Winter (China)
 January 31: 
 Arpeggio of Blue Steel (Japan)
 Pleasant Goat and Big Big Wolf – Amazing Pleasant Goat (China)
 February 3 - Scooby-Doo! Moon Monster Madness (United States)
 February 5 - Legend of the Moles – The Magic Train Adventure (China)
 February 6:
 Shaun the Sheep Movie (United Kingdom)
 The SpongeBob Movie: Sponge Out of Water (United States)
 February 10 - Lego DC Comics Super Heroes: Justice League vs. Bizarro League (United States)
 February 14 - Peppa Pig: The Golden Boots (United Kingdom)
 February 19 - Xinnian is Coming – Uproar of Chuxi (China)
 February 20 - The Case of Hana & Alice (Japan)
 February 21 - Legend of a Rabbit: The Martial of Fire (China)
 February 26:
 Albert (Denmark)
 Ooops! Noah Is Gone... (Germany, Belgium, Luxembourg and Ireland)
 March 3:
 Barbie in Princess Power (United States)
 LeapFrog Letter Factory Adventures: Amazing Word Explorers (United States)
 VeggieTales: Noah's Ark (United States)
 March 7:
 Doraemon: Nobita's Space Hero Record of Space Heroes (Japan)
 Gekijō-ban PriPara Mi~nna Atsumare! Prism Tours (Japan)
 March 10 - The Flintstones & WWE: Stone Age SmackDown! (United States)
 March 14 - PreCure All Stars: Spring Carnival (Japan)
 March 27:
 10000 Years Later (China)
 Home (United States)
 April 4:
 Persona 3 The Movie: No. 3, Falling Down (Japan)
 Tamayura: Sotsugyō Shashin Dai-1-bu -Kizashi- (Japan)
 April 7 - Batman vs. Robin (United States)
 April 8 - Animal Kingdom: Let's Go Ape (France, Belgium and Italy)
 April 10: 
 Kung Fu Style (China)
 Wicked Flying Monkeys (Mexico and India)
 April 18:
 Crayon Shin-Chan: My Moving Story! Cactus Large Attack! (Japan)
 Detective Conan: Sunflowers of Inferno (Japan)
 Dragon Ball Z: Resurrection 'F' (Japan)
 April 20 - Space Forces 2911 (Turkey)
 April 24 - Canine Team (Mexico)
 April 25 - Beyond the Boundary (Japan)
 April 30 - Teenage Mao Zedong (China)
 May 9 - Miss Hokusai (Japan)
 May 12 - Batman Unlimited: Animal Instincts (United States)
 May 22 - 3 Bahadur (Pakistan)
 May 23 - Alibaba and the Thief (China)
 May 28 - Little from the Fish Shop (Czech Republic, France and Slovakia)
 May 29:
 The Grow 2 (China)
 Happy Little Submarine Magic Box of Time (China)
 May 30 - Rabbit Hero (China)
 June 3 - The Nutcracker Sweet (Peru)
 June 5 - Pixies (Canada)
 June 9 - Tom and Jerry: Spy Quest (United States)
 June 13:
 LokalFilmis (Slovakia)
 Love Live! The School Idol Movie (Japan)
 June 16 - Long Way North (France and Denmark)
 June 19 - Inside Out (United States)
 June 20: 
 Get Squirrely (United States)
 Kōkaku Kidōtai Shin Gekijōban (Japan)
 June 23 - Curious George 3: Back to the Jungle (United States)
 June 27: 
 The Adventures of Little Piglet Banna (China)
 Attack on Titan Part 2: Wings of Freedom (Japan)
 July 3 - Xi You Xin Chuan 2: Zhen Xin Hua Da Mao Xian (China)
 July 4:
 The Autobots (China)
 Sinbad: Sora Tobu Hime to Himitsu no Shima (Japan)
 The Three Pigs and the Lamp (China)
 July 10: 
 GG Bond Movie: Ultimate Battle (China)
 Minions (United States)
 Monkey King: Hero Is Back (China)
 Scooby-Doo! and Kiss: Rock and Roll Mystery (United States)
 July 11 - The Boy and the Beast (Japan)
 July 18: 
 Gekijōban Meiji Tokyo Renka: Yumihari no Serenade (Japan)
 Pokémon the Movie: Hoopa and the Clash of Ages (Japan)
 July 21 - Justice League: Gods and Monsters (United States)
 July 23:
 Aura Star: Attack of the Temple (China)
 Seer Movie 5: Rise of Thunder (China)
 July 29 - The Little Prince (France and Italy)
 July 31 - The Little Mermaid: Attack of the Pirates (China)
 August 4: 
 Alpha and Omega: Family Vacation (United States and Canada)
 Looney Tunes: Rabbits Run (United States)
 August 6 - Kwai Boo (China)
 August 7:
 Boruto: Naruto the Movie (Japan)
 Mr. Black: Green Star (China)
 August 13 - Roco Kingdom 4 (China)
 August 14 - Snow White: The Mysterious Father (China)
 August 15 - Happy Panda 2: Panda Hero Legend (China)
 August 18 - Batman Unlimited: Monster Mayhem (United States)
 August 20:
 Huevos: Little Rooster's Egg-cellent Adventure (Mexico)
 Raven the Little Rascal – The Big Race (Germany)
 August 22 - Date A Live: The Movie – Mayuri Judgement (Japan)
 August 23 - Aikatsu! Music Award: Minna de Shō o Moraima SHOW! (Japan)
 August 25:
 Capture The Flag (Spain)
 Lego DC Comics Super Heroes: Justice League – Attack of the Legion of Doom (United States)
 August 28 - A Jewish Girl in Shanghai: The Mystery of the Necklace (China)
 August 29 - Tamayura: Sotsugyō Shashin Dai-2-bu -Hibiki- (Japan)
 September 1 - Regular Show: The Movie (United States)
 September 3 - Enchanted Mirror Romance (China)
 September 8:
 Barbie in Rock'n Royals (United States)
 LeapFrog Letter Factory Adventures: The Great Shape Mystery (United States)
 Sodor's Legend of the Lost Treasure (United States)
 September 13 - Yoko and His Friends (Spain and Russia)
 September 15 - Caroline and the Magic Potion (Spain)
 September 17 - Blinky Bill the Movie (Australia)
 September 19 - The Anthem of the Heart (Japan)
 September 20 - Two Buddies and a Badger (Norway)
 September 24 - Birdboy: The Forgotten Children (Spain)
 September 25:
 Hotel Transylvania 2 (United States)
 Wake Up, Girls! The Shadow of Youth (Japan)
 September 26: 
 CJ7: Super Q Team (China)
 My Little Pony: Equestria Girls – Friendship Games (United States and Canada)
 October 1 - Polar Adventure (China)
 October 2: 
 The Empire of Corpses (Japan)
 Hell & Back (United States)
 October 3 - Arpeggio of Blue Steel -Ars Nova Cadenza- (Japan)
 October 4 - A Tale From The Orient (China)
 October 9 - The Magic Mountain (Romania, France and Poland)
 October 10:
 Air Bound (Japan)
 UFO Gakuen no Himitsu (Japan)
 October 14 - Phantom Boy (France and Belgium)
 October 20 - Barbie & Her Sisters in The Great Puppy Adventure (United States)
 October 21 - Adama (France)
 October 22 - Sergiy Radonezhsky. The Legend of Miracle Worker (Russia)
 October 23 - Where's the Dragon? (China)
 October 29 - Fortress (Russia)
 October 30:
 The Firefox of Bunnington Burrows (China)
 Top Cat Begins (Mexico and India)
 November 4 - April and the Extraordinary World (France, Belgium and Canada)
 November 5 - Trenk, the Little Knight (Germany and Austria)
 November 6 - The Peanuts Movie (United States)
 November 11 - Kuru Kuru and Friends: The Secrets of the Rainbow Tree (South Korea)
 November 12 - A Warrior's Tail (Russia)
 November 13:
 Harmony (Japan)
 Snowtime! (Canada)
 When Black Birds Fly (United States)
 November 20 - The King of Tibetan Antelope (China)
 November 21:
 Digimon Adventure tri. Reunion (Japan)
 Girls und Panzer der Film (Japan)
 November 25 - The Good Dinosaur (United States)
 November 26 - Reveries of a Solitary Walker (Italy)
 November 27 - Ajin Part 1: Shōdō (Japan)
 November 28 - Tamayura 3 (Japan)
 December 1 - Bob's Broken Sleigh (Canada)
 December 5 - High Speed! Free! Starting Days (Japan)
 December 9 - Bilal: A New Breed of Hero (United Arab Emirates)
 December 11 - Wake Up, Girls! Beyond the Bottom (Japan)
 December 12:
 El Bandido Cucaracha (Spain)
 The Winner (China)
 December 13 - Pororo 3: Cyber Space Adventure (South Korea)
 December 18 - Open Season: Scared Silly (United States)
 December 19 - Eiga Yo-Kai Watch: Enma Daioh to Itsutsu no Monogatari da Nyan! (Japan)
 December 20 - Gulu Mermaid (China)
 December 23 - Chibi Maruko-chan: Italia Kara Kita Shōnen (Japan)
 December 25 - Louis & Luca – The Great Cheese Race (Norway)
 December 30 - Anomalisa (United States)
 Specific date unknown:
 Last Prince of Atlantis (Russia)
 Morengen Bear vs Man (China)

Television series debuts

Television series endings

Deaths

January
 January 6: Lance Percival, English actor, comedian and singer (voice of Paul McCartney and Ringo Starr in The Beatles, Old Fred in Yellow Submarine), dies at age 81.
 January 7: Rod Taylor, American actor (voice of Pongo in 101 Dalmatians), dies at age 84.
 January 13: José Luis Moro, Spanish animator and comics artist (La Familia Telérín), dies at age 88.
 January 16: Walt Peregoy, American artist (Walt Disney Productions, Format Films, Hanna-Barbera), dies at age 89.
 January 22:
 René Jodoin, Canadian animation director and producer (founder of French Animation Studio), dies at age 94.
 Norman Henry Mamey, American composer, conductor, music arranger, musician and orchestrator (The Angry Beavers), dies from pancreatic cancer at age 66.
 January 23: Barrie Ingham, English actor (voice of Basil in The Great Mouse Detective), dies at age 82.
 January 26: Stephen R. Johnson, American animator, painter, television director and music video director (Sledgehammer), dies at age 62.
 January 28: Phil Robinson, American animator (Hanna-Barbera, The Dreamstone), storyboard artist (Heathcliff, Alvin and the Chipmunks, The Electric Piper), writer, director (The Twisted Tales of Felix the Cat) and producer (co-founder of WildBrain), dies from pancreatic cancer at an unknown age.

February
 February 1: Monty Oum, American animator, animation director and voice actor (Rooster Teeth, Red vs. Blue), dies at age 33 after an allergic reaction.
 February 4: Carl Ritchie, American actor (voice of Bert the Turtle in Duck and Cover), dies at age 91. 
 February 12: Gary Owens, American actor (voice of Space Ghost in Space Ghost, Blue Falcon in Dynomutt, Dog Wonder, the title character of Roger Ramjet, Powdered Toast Man in The Ren & Stimpy Show, Commander Ulysses Feral in SWAT Kats: The Radical Squadron), dies at age 80. 
 February 20: Gérard Calvi, French composer (Astérix), dies at age 92.
 February 27: 
 Richard Bakalyan, Armenian-American actor (voice of M.C. Bird in It's Tough to be a Bird, Dinky in The Fox and the Hound), dies at age 84.
 Tod Dockstader, American composer (Terrytoons, Kim Deitch) and sound effects artist (Tom and Jerry), dies at age 82.
 Leonard Nimoy, American actor (voice of Spock in Star Trek: The Animated Series, Galvatron in The Transformers: The Movie, Mr. Moundshroud in The Halloween Tree, King Kashekim Nedakh in Atlantis: The Lost Empire, voiced himself in The Simpsons episodes "Marge vs. the Monorail" and "The Springfield Files", and the Futurama episodes "Space Pilot 3000" and "Where No Fan Has Gone Before"), dies at age 83.

March
 March 5: Gordon Kent, American animator (Fangface), storyboard artist (Ruby-Spears Enterprises, The Scooby and Scrappy-Doo Puppy Hour, Mork & Mindy/Laverne & Shirley/Fonz Hour, Tom and Jerry: The Fast and the Furry, Ben 10: Destroy All Aliens), sheet timer (Bureau of Alien Detectors, Life with Louie, X-Men: The Animated Series, Disney Television Animation, All Dogs Go to Heaven: The Series, Courage the Cowardly Dog, CatDog, Warner Bros. Animation, Stripperella, Codename: Kids Next Door, Holly Hobbie & Friends, Family Guy, Film Roman, The Land Before Time, Chowder, Adventure Time, Allen Gregory, Bob's Burgers, Brickleberry), lip sync artist (Dead Space: Aftermath), recording director (Scooby-Doo! in Arabian Nights, A Flintstones Christmas Carol), writer (Ruby-Spears Enterprises, Hanna-Barbera, Marvel Productions, Star Wars: Droids, Garbage Pail Kids, Tiny Toon Adventures, Beetlejuice, Mother Goose and Grimm, Disney Television Animation, Taz-Mania, The Real Shlemiel, Spider-Man, Pocket Dragon Adventures), producer (Hanna-Barbera, Bonkers) and director (Teen Wolf, The Prince of Atlantis, Disney Television Animation, The Grim Adventures of Billy & Mandy), dies at age 61.
 March 8: Sam Simon, American television director, producer, designer and writer (The Simpsons), dies at age 59.
 March 10: Allan Lurie, American actor (voice of Mezmaron in Pac-Man, Uglor the Alien in Space Stars), dies at age 91.
 March 12: Matt Landers, American actor (voice of Frankie in Batman: The Animated Series, Captain Logan in Bill & Ted's Excellent Adventures, Louie in the Batman Beyond episode "Terry's Friend Dates A Robot", Turk in the Freakazoid! episode "Hot Rods from Heck!", Gang Leader in The New Batman Adventures episode "Growing Pains", Robber in the Superman: The Animated Series episode "Heavy Metal"), dies at age 62.
 March 30: Roger Slifer, American comic book writer, screenwriter, and television producer (Sunbow Entertainment), dies at age 60.

April
 April 1: Robert Walker, Canadian-American animator (Atkinson Film-Arts, The Raccoons, Walt Disney Animation Studios), storyboard artist (Dennis the Menace), background artist (COPS) and director (Brother Bear), dies from a heart attack at age 54.
 April 6: Cliff Voorhees, American comic book artist and background artist (Filmation, Hanna-Barbera, Marvel Productions, Garfield and Friends, Bobby's World, Mother Goose and Grimm, Tom and Jerry: The Movie, The Simpsons, The Critic, The Twisted Tales of Felix the Cat, The Shnookums & Meat Funny Cartoon Show, Timon & Pumbaa, The Story of Santa Claus, The Brave Little Toaster to the Rescue, King of the Hill, The Angry Beavers, The Brave Little Toaster Goes to Mars, Mad Jack the Pirate, The Grim Adventures of Billy & Mandy, Evil Con Carne), dies at age 85.
 April 7: Stan Freberg, American comedian and actor (voice of the beaver in Lady and the Tramp, Junior Bear and Pete Puma in Looney Tunes, Mo-Ron in Freakazoid!, Dr. Whipple in The Garfield Show), dies at age 88.
 April 9: Al Pabian, American animator (Chuck Jones, Peanuts specials), dies at age 97.

May
 May 4: Ellen Albertini Dow, American actress and drama coach (voice of See's Candies Box in Eight Crazy Nights, Helen Washburn and Old Woman #2 in American Dad!, Elderly Woman and Aunt Helen in Family Guy, Azma in The Emperor's New School episode "The Bride of Kuzco"), dies from pneumonia at age 101.
 May 10: Anita Gordon, American singer and actress (voice of the Harp in Fun and Fancy Free), dies at age 85. 
 May 15: John Stephenson, American actor (voice of Mr. Slate in The Flintstones, Dr. Benton Quest in the first 5 episodes of Jonny Quest, numerous roles in the Scooby-Doo franchise, Fancy Fancy in Top Cat, Doctor Doom and Magneto in The New Fantastic Four, X the Eliminator in Birdman and the Galaxy Trio, Colossus, Doctor Strange, and Loki in Spider-Man and His Amazing Friends, Huffer, Windcharger, Thundercracker, Alpha Trion, and Kup in The Transformers, continued voice of Doggie Daddy), dies at age 91–92.

June
 June 7: Christopher Lee, English actor (voice of King Haggard in The Last Unicorn, Pastor Galswells in Corpse Bride, Count Dooku in Star Wars: The Clone Wars), dies at age 93.
 June 11: Ron Moody, English actor, singer and composer (voice of Badger and Toad in The Animals of Farthing Wood, Noah the polar bear, Rocco the gorilla, Reg the mandrill, Squadron Leader the vulture in Noah's Island), dies at age 91.
 June 21: Roland Dupree, American actor, dancer, and choreographer (live-action model for the title character in Peter Pan), dies at age 89.
 June 22: James Horner, American composer and conductor (An American Tail, The Land Before Time, An American Tail: Fievel Goes West, Once Upon a Forest, We're Back! A Dinosaur's Story, The Pagemaster, and Balto), dies at age 61 in a plane crash.
 June 27: Jane Aaron, American illustrator and animator (Between the Lions, Sesame Street), dies at age 67 from cancer.
 June 28: Jack Carter, American comedian, actor and television presenter (voice of Wilbur Cobb in The Ren & Stimpy Show, Irwin Linker in King of the Hill, Harry in the Superman: The Animated Series episode "Warrior Queen", Tiresias in the Hercules episode "Hercules and the Griffin", Ziff Twyman in the Pinky, Elmyra & the Brain episode "That's Edutainment", Frieda's Grandfather in the Static Shock episode "Frozen Out", Old Man in the Family Guy episode "Grumpy Old Man", Sid in the Justice League Unlimited episode "This Little Piggy"), dies at age 93.
 June 30: Paolo Piffarerio, Italian comics artist and animator (La Lunga Calza Verde) and film producer (Gamma Film), dies at age 90.

July
 July 4: Valerio Ruggeri, Italian actor (Italian dub voice of Rabbit in Winnie the Pooh), dies at age 81.
 July 17: Alan Kupperberg, American comics artist and animator (Don Bluth), dies of thymus cancer at age 62.
 July 18: Alex Rocco, American actor (voice of Roger Meyers, Jr. in The Simpsons, Thorny in A Bug's Life, Larry in Pepper Ann, Bea Arthur and Soccer Mom in Family Guy, Carmine Falcone in Batman: Year One, Mr. Malone in the Bonkers episode "Frame That Toon", Lucky Rabbit in The Angry Beavers episode "Big Fun", Old Caddie in The Life & Times of Tim episode "The Caddy's Shack", additional voices in Lloyd in Space), dies from pancreatic cancer at age 79.
 July 24: Irvin S. Bauer, American playwright, educator and television writer (Bonkers, Courage the Cowardly Dog), dies from lymphoma at an unknown age.
 July 31: Roddy Piper, Canadian professional wrestler and actor (voice of Bolphunga in Green Lantern: Emerald Knights, Don John in the Adventure Time episode "The Red Throne", himself in the Robot Chicken episode "Metal Militia"), dies at age 61.

August
 August 8: Susan Sheridan, English actress (voice of Princess Eilonwy in The Black Cauldron, Noddy in Noddy's Toyland Adventures), dies at age 68.
 August 13: Richard Manginsay, Filipino-born American animator (Anastasia, Bartok the Magnificent, Futurama, King of the Hill, The Simpsons, The Simpsons Movie), storyboard artist (Family Guy), character designer (The Simpsons, Dead Space: Downfall) and prop designer (The Simpsons), dies from cancer at age 43.
 August 22: Merl Reagle, American crossword constructor (voiced himself and provided the crossword puzzles in The Simpsons episode "Homer and Lisa Exchange Cross Words"), dies from acute pancreatitis at age 65.

September
 September 1: Dean Jones, American actor (voice of George Newton in Beethoven, Dean Arbagast in Batman & Mr. Freeze: SubZero, Ahasuerus in The Greatest Adventure: Stories from the Bible episode "Queen Esther", Dr. Karel in The Real Adventures of Jonny Quest episode "DNA Doomsday", Abraham Lincoln in the Nightmare Ned episode "Monster Ned", Sam Lane in the Superman: The Animated Series episode "Monkey Time", Chauncey in the Adventures from the Book of Virtues episode "Trushworthiness"), dies at age 84.
 September 21: Yoram Gross, Polish-born Australian producer (Dot and the Kangaroo and its sequels), dies at age 88.

October
 October 6: Kevin Corcoran, American child actor (voice of the title character in Goliath II, Goofy Jr. in Aquamania), dies at age 66.
 October 21: Marty Ingels, American actor and comedian (voice of the title character in Pac-Man, Hathi in The Jungle Book: Mowgli's Story, Beegle Beagle in The Great Grape Ape Show, Autocat in Cattanooga Cats), dies from a stroke at age 79.

November
 November 2: Frank Budgen, English commercial director and co-founder of Gorgeous Enterprises (directed the NSPCC advert "Cartoon"), dies from cancer at age 61.
 November 3: Victor Wilson, American television writer (Nickelodeon Animation Studio), producer (The Adventures of Jimmy Neutron, Boy Genius) and actor (voice of Phuepal in Aaahh!!! Real Monsters, Bing in The Angry Beavers, Announcer in Rocket Power, Mr. Ward in As Told by Ginger), dies at age 51.

December
 December 4: Robert Loggia, American actor (voice of Bill Sykes in Oliver & Company, Grandpa Jehan in The Dog of Flanders, Lew Peterson in the Tom Goes to the Mayor episode "Saxman", himself in the Family Guy episodes "Brothers & Sisters" and "Call Girl"), dies from Alzheimer's disease at age 85.
 December 31: 
 Beth Howland, American actress (voice of Singer in the Batman Beyond episode "Out of the Past", Dr. Leventhal in the As Told by Ginger episode "And She Was Gone"), dies from lung cancer at age 76.
 Natalie Cole, American singer, songwriter, and actress (singing voice of Sawyer in Cats Don't Dance, sang "Rise and Shine" in The Care Bears Adventure in Wonderland), dies at age 65.

Specific date unknown
 David Anderson, English film director (Dreamland Express), dies at age 62 or 63.
 Peg Dixon, Canadian actress (voice of Mrs. Claus and Mrs. Donner in Rudolph the Red-Nosed Reindeer, Betty Brant in Spider-Man), dies at age 92.

See also 
2015 in anime

References

External links 
Animated works of the year, listed in the IMDb

 
2010s in animation
2015